The 2018 FIFA World Cup qualification UEFA Group G was one of the nine UEFA groups for 2018 FIFA World Cup qualification. The group consisted of six teams: Spain, Italy, Albania, Israel, Macedonia, and Liechtenstein.

The draw for the first round (group stage) was held as part of the 2018 FIFA World Cup Preliminary Draw on 25 July 2015, starting 18:00 MSK (UTC+3), at the Konstantinovsky Palace in Strelna, Saint Petersburg, Russia.

The group winners, Spain, qualified directly for the 2018 FIFA World Cup. The group runners-up, Italy, advanced to the play-offs as one of the best eight runners-up.

Standings

Matches
The fixture list was confirmed by UEFA on 26 July 2015, the day following the draw. Times are CET/CEST, as listed by UEFA (local times are in parentheses).

Goalscorers
There were 93 goals scored in 30 matches, for an average of  goals per match.

6 goals

 Ciro Immobile

5 goals

 Diego Costa
 Isco
 Álvaro Morata
 David Silva

4 goals

 Andrea Belotti
 Ilija Nestorovski
 Vitolo

3 goals

 Armando Sadiku
 Tomer Hemed
 Antonio Candreva
 Aleksandar Trajkovski

2 goals

 Bekim Balaj
 Odise Roshi
 Tal Ben Haim II
 Daniele De Rossi
 Iago Aspas

1 goal

 Ansi Agolli
 Ledian Memushaj
 Eliran Atar
 Dan Einbinder
 Lior Refaelov
 Eytan Tibi
 Eran Zahavi
 Federico Bernardeschi
 Giorgio Chiellini
 Éder
 Manolo Gabbiadini
 Lorenzo Insigne
 Graziano Pellè
 Maximilian Göppel
 Arijan Ademi
 Ezgjan Alioski
 Enis Bardhi
 Ferhan Hasani
 Visar Musliu
 Boban Nikolov
 Goran Pandev
 Stefan Ristovski
 Aritz Aduriz
 Asier Illarramendi
 Nacho Monreal
 Nolito
 Sergio Ramos
 Sergi Roberto
 Rodrigo
 Thiago

1 own goal

 Maximilian Göppel (against Spain)
 Peter Jehle (against Albania)
 Darko Velkovski (against Spain)

Discipline
A player was automatically suspended for the next match for the following offences:
 Receiving a red card (red card suspensions could be extended for serious offences)
 Receiving two yellow cards in two different matches (yellow card suspensions were carried forward to the play-offs, but not the finals or any other future international matches)

The following suspensions were served during the qualifying matches:

Notes

References

External links

Qualifiers – Europe: Round 1, FIFA.com
FIFA World Cup, UEFA.com
Standings – Qualifying round: Group G, UEFA.com

G
2016–17 in Republic of Macedonia football
2017–18 in Republic of Macedonia football
Spain at the 2018 FIFA World Cup